"Why Me" is the lead single off Kierra "Kiki" Sheard's This Is Me.

Chart performance
Do to a success album, the single became successful as well. Why Me worked its way up the Top Gospel charts to number 6. The song has no official music video except her performance at 2007 Gospel Stellar Awards.

Charts

Track listing
Why Me- 3:26
Yes-2:56

References

Gospel songs
2006 singles
Songs written by Rodney Jerkins
Song recordings produced by Rodney Jerkins
Songs written by LaShawn Daniels
Songs written by Fred Jerkins III